The 2016 Hoff Open was a professional tennis tournament played on clay courts. It was the second edition of the tournament which was part of the 2016 ATP Challenger Tour. It took place in Moscow, Russia between 6 and 12 June 2016.

Singles main-draw entrants

Seeds

 1 Rankings are as of May 30, 2016.

Other entrants
The following players received wildcards into the singles main draw:
  Alexander Bublik
  Aslan Karatsev
  Denis Shapovalov
  Alexandre Sidorenko

The following players received entry into the singles main draw with a protected ranking:
  Blaž Kavčič

The following players received entry from the qualifying draw:
  Emilio Gómez
  Miki Janković
  Ronald Slobodchikov
  Alexander Zhurbin

Champions

Singles

  Mikhail Kukushkin def.  Steven Diez, 6–3, 6–3

Doubles

  Facundo Argüello /  Roberto Maytín def.  Aleksandre Metreveli /  Dmitry Popko, 6–2, 7–5

External links
Official Website

Hoff Open
2016
2016 in Russian tennis